is a song by Japanese pop rock band U-ka Saegusa in dB. It was released on 15 June 2005 through Giza Studio, as the second single from their third studio album U-ka saegusa IN db III. The single reached number twelve in Japan and has sold over 21,712 copies nationwide. The song served as the theme songs to the Japanese anime television series, Case Closed.

Track listing

Cover version
"June Bride ~Anata shika Mienai~" was covered by Asami Imai, Yumi Hara, and Manami Numakura in 2011. This version was included on the compilation album, The Idolmaster Station!!! Third Travel Wanted (2011).

Charts

Certification and sales

|-
! scope="row"| Japan (RIAJ)
| 
| 21,712
|-
|}

Release history

References

2005 singles
2005 songs
J-pop songs
Song recordings produced by Daiko Nagato
Songs with music by Akihito Tokunaga